Drug instillation, also known as medication instillation, is the administration of a medicine, generally in liquid form either drop by drop or with a catheter into a body space or cavity. Drop by drop administration may be done for eye drops, ear drops, or nose drops. It differs from therapeutic irrigation in that the solution is removed within minutes, but the instillate is left in place.

References

Medical procedures